Cambrón is a common name for several plants, derived from the Spanish language:

 Certain algarrobo, bayahonda and mesquite trees (Prosopis species) in the Fabaceae
 Certain acacias (e.g. Acacia macracantha and Acacia farnesiana) in the Fabaceae
 Rhamnus cathartica in the Rhamnaceae

See also
 Cambron